Norbu Wangzom is a Bhutanese politician who has been a member of the National Assembly of Bhutan, since October 2018.
Previously she was the member of the National Assembly of Bhutan from 2008 to 2013.

Education 
She holds a Bachelor of Science degree from Sherubtse College.

Political career 
She was elected to the National Assembly of Bhutan as a candidate of DPT from Jomotshangkha Martshala constituency in 2008 Bhutanese National Assembly election. She received 4,008 votes and defeated Pelzang Wangchuk, a candidate of PDP.

She ran for the seat of the National Assembly of Bhutan as a candidate of DPT in the 2013 Bhutanese National Assembly election, but was unsuccessful. She received 2,458 votes and lost the seat to the same opponent, Pelzang Wangchuk.

She was elected to the National Assembly of Bhutan as a candidate of DPT from Jomotshangkha Martshala constituency in 2018 Bhutanese National Assembly election. She received 4,372 votes and defeated Ugyen Dorji, a candidate of DNT.

References 

1980 births
Living people
Bhutanese MNAs 2018–2023
Druk Phuensum Tshogpa politicians
Bhutanese women in politics
Bhutanese MNAs 2008–2013
Sherubtse College alumni
Druk Phuensum Tshogpa MNAs